José Luis Allende (4 February 1926 – 26 January 2015) was a Spanish sailor. He competed in the Star event at the 1948 Summer Olympics.

References

External links
 

1926 births
2015 deaths
Spanish male sailors (sport)
Olympic sailors of Spain
Sailors at the 1948 Summer Olympics – Star
Sportspeople from Madrid